Hugo Lake is manmade lake located  east of Hugo, in Choctaw County, Oklahoma, United States. The dam is visible from U.S. Route 70, which crosses its spillway just west of Sawyer. The lake's primary functions are to provide flood control, water storage, and recreational opportunities.

The nearest major cities to Lake Hugo are Fort Smith, Arkansas (101 miles), Dallas, Texas (114 miles) and Oklahoma City, Oklahoma(151 miles).

History 
Authorized by the Flood Control Act of 1946 and Flood Control Act of 1962 construction on the dam began in October 1967. The US Army Corps of Engineers completed the project in January 1974 at a cost of approximately $37,000,000.

The US Army Corps of Engineers established Kiamichi Park on the lake just west of the dam site in 1974. The park was cut in half part of it still belonging to the US Army Corps of Engineers and the other was leased to the State in 2002 it was renamed Hugo Lake State Park.

Recreation 
The south  of the lake nearest to the dam are clear of obstructions and provide recreational opportunities for watersports such as boating and water skiing. The state park provides cabins, hiking trails, and a 56-slip marina.

The north end of the lake is not cleared and contains dead tree stumps in the water.  These stumps provide cover for the fish and ideal conditions for anglers.  Hugo Lake features excellent crappie fishing and populations of bass and catfish.

In addition fishing there is also hunting and animal trapping at Hugo Lake. The Oklahoma Department of Wildlife Conservation administers  at the lake, and the US Army Corps of Engineers manage 8,000.  These areas are home to white tail deer, waterfowl, mink, fox, and beaver.

Controversy over water sales

In recent years Hugo Lake has been in the middle of a controversy regarding out-of-state water sales between Texas and Oklahoma. The city of Hugo had sought to sell water to the growing suburbs of Dallas that need new sources of water to pay debts related to the lake.  Irving, Texas has entered negotiations with the Hugo to obtain a supply of fresh water by building a pipeline and purchasing excess water from Hugo Lake.  In 2002 the Oklahoma state legislature passed a moratorium on water sales outside the state.  Hugo sued the state in federal court citing that the state's moratorium is unconstitutional.

Hugo Lake State Park

On Hugo Lake the Hugo Lake State Park offers boating and fishing opportunities. The park offers 16 two bedroom resort cabins, 10 primitive cabins, a 56-slip full service marina with store, pavilions, picnic sites with grills and tables, and pontoon boat rentals. Hiking, biking, and nature trails are also on site. Tent camping is also available. The park is 1 of 7 Oklahoma State Parks that are in the path of totality for the 2024 solar eclipse, with 3 minutes and 33 seconds of totality.

References

External links 
 Hugo Lake State Park
 Hugo Lake information and video on TravelOK.com Official travel and tourism website for the State of Oklahoma
 Oklahoma Digital Maps: Digital Collections of Oklahoma and Indian Territory

Protected areas of Choctaw County, Oklahoma
State parks of Oklahoma
Dams in Oklahoma
United States Army Corps of Engineers dams
Dams completed in 1974
Reservoirs in Oklahoma
Bodies of water of Choctaw County, Oklahoma